Shavur may refer to:
 Rashg-e Shavur
 Sadd-e Shavur
 Shavur District
 Shavur Rural District